John McMahon (born 7 December 1949 in Manchester) is an English former footballer.

A full-back who joined Preston North End in 1965 aged sixteen, he made his first team debut on 6 October 1970 in a League Cup tie against West Bromwich Albion.

He had a loan spell at Southend United in 1970-71 (playing 4 games) before establishing himself as a first team regular in 1971-72 when he was named as the club's Player of the Year.

In total he played 291 games for Preston (including 1 as substitute) between 1970 and 1979 and scored 6 goals. He played one game on loan at Chesterfield before moving to Crewe Alexandra in 1979.

References

External links
 

1949 births
Living people
Footballers from Manchester
Preston North End F.C. players
Crewe Alexandra F.C. players
English footballers
Southend United F.C. players
Chesterfield F.C. players
Wigan Athletic F.C. players
Tranmere Rovers F.C. players
Altrincham F.C. players
Association football fullbacks
English Football League players